Autoroute 610 (A-610), also known as Autoroute Louis Bilodeau, is a short spur autoroute serving the eastern and northern suburbs of Sherbrooke, Quebec, Canada. It bypasses Sherbrooke's city centre to the north and connects the A-55 and A-10 to Route 112, a primary regional link to East Angus, Thetford Mines, and Lac-Mégantic.

History
The first section of Highway 610 was opened to traffic in 1988 as an extension of the A-10. The eastern part (east of Exit 7, formerly Exit 150), opened in 1992, is a two-lane freeway. Original plans for the A-10 called for it to continue east to Thetford Mines, but this section was never built. On 29 September 2006, Transports Québec announced plans to redesignate the section of A-10 east of the A-55 as Autoroute 610. The MTQ's rationale was that the new route number is more consistent with the Quebec road numbering plan and would be less confusing to motorists travelling through and beyond the region. As a result, Autoroute 10 (multiplexed with the A-55 east of km 121) reaches its terminus at the interchange with A-610. 

A proposal to build the East-West Highway across central and northern Maine calls for the A-610 (its original numbering as A-10 restored) to be extended to the U.S. border at Coburn Gore where it would meet the new highway. Doing so would create a new and more direct limited-access highway link between Maine, the Maritimes, and Montreal.

Exit list
The entire route is in Sherbrooke.

References

External links

Transport Quebec
Transports Quebec Map 
A-610 at Quebec Autoroutes
News story on renaming of A-610 (Le Matin, French)

10-6
Transport in Sherbrooke